Kekurny Island is a very small island in the Gertner Inlet of Taui Bay, in the Sea of Okhotsk, within Magadan Oblast, Russian Far East.

Geography

Administratively, Kekurny Island is a part of the city of Magadan.

See also
Islands of the Sea of Okhotsk
Islands of the Russian Far East

References

Islands of the Sea of Okhotsk
Islands of the Russian Far East
Islands of Magadan Oblast